The Central Arizona Correctional Facility is a medium-security privately managed state prison for men located in Florence, Pinal County, Arizona, owned and operated by the GEO Group under contract with the Arizona Department of Corrections.  

GEO Group's predecessor firm, Correctional Services Corporation, designed and built the facility.  It opened in December 2006 and has the maximum capacity of 1280 prisoners held at a medium security level. 

CACF should not be confused with the nearby Central Arizona Detention Center, run by Corrections Corporation of America, which houses prisoners for the United States Marshals Service, TransCor America LLC, U.S. Immigration and Customs Enforcement, Pascua Yaqui Tribe government, and the United States Air Force, but does not house Arizona state prisoners.

References

Prisons in Arizona
Private prisons in the United States
Buildings and structures in Pinal County, Arizona
GEO Group
Florence, Arizona
2006 establishments in Arizona